2-Methylnaphthalene is a polycyclic aromatic hydrocarbon (PAH).

On February 22, 2014, NASA announced a greatly upgraded database for detecting and monitoring PAHs, including 2-methylnaphthalene, in the universe. According to NASA scientists, over 20% of the carbon in the universe may be associated with PAHs, possible starting materials for the formation of life. PAHs seem to have been formed shortly after the Big Bang, are abundant in the universe, and are associated with new stars and exoplanets.

Several enzymes biodegrade 2-methyhlnaphthalene in anaerobic conditions.

See also 
 1-Methylnaphthalene

References

2-Naphthyl compounds
Aromatic hydrocarbons